Ross Adair (born 21 April 1994) is an Irish cricketer and former rugby union player. He plays for the Northern Knights in domestic cricket. His younger brother, Mark Adair, is also a cricketer.

Cricket career 
He made his Twenty20 debut for the Northern Knights in the 2020 Inter-Provincial Trophy on 20 August 2020. He made his List A debut on 30 June 2021, for Northern Knights in the 2021 Inter-Provincial Cup.

In December 2022, he earned his maiden call-up to the Ireland cricket team for their T20I series against Zimbabwe. He made his Twenty20 International (T20I) debut for Ireland, on 12 January 2023 in the first T20I match.

Rugby career 
He played schools rugby for Sullivan Upper School, impressing in the Ulster Schools' Cup in 2011. He played for the Ulster Ravens in the British and Irish Cup,  and made one senior appearance for Ulster in the Pro12, scoring a try against Dragons in 2015.

He played for Jersey Reds in the RFU Championship for two and a half years, making more than 40 appearances before a degenerative hip condition ended his professional career. Following two operations, he returned to rugby at an amateur level with Ballynahinch RFC, with whom he won the Ulster Senior League in 2019, and was named Club Player of the Year in the Ulster Rugby awards.

References

External links
 

1994 births
Living people
Irish cricketers
Northern Knights cricketers
Place of birth missing (living people)
Ulster Rugby players